Aha Naa Pellanta! may refer to:

 Aha Naa-Pellanta! (1987 film), a Telugu-language comedy film
 Aha Naa Pellanta! (2011 film), an Indian Telugu-language comedy film